The 2003 Copa Libertadores de América (officially the 2003 Copa Toyota Libertadores de América for sponsorship reasons) was the 44th edition of the Copa Libertadores, CONMEBOL's premier annual international club tournament.

The tournament was won by Boca Juniors after defeating Santos in a rematch of the 1963 Copa Libertadores Finals. With this title, Boca Juniors achieved their fifth Copa Libertadores title and third in four years.

Group stage

Group 1

Group 2

Group 3

Group 4

Group 5

Group 6

Group 7

Group 8

Bracket

Round of 16 

|}

Quarterfinals 

|}

Semi-finals 

|}

Finals

References

External links
 Copa Libertadores 2003 
 2003 Copa Libertadores at RSSSF

1
Copa Libertadores seasons